The 2011-12 season was River Plate's first season in the Primera B Nacional, following relegation from the Primera División in 2011. It was Matías Almeyda's first season in charge at the club.

Season review
See also 2011–12 Primera B Nacional

On 19 December 2011, David Trezeguet joined River Plate on a three-year deal after terminating his contract on 21 November 2011 with Baniyas of the UAE Pro-League.

Transfers

In

Out

Squad

On loan 

 (at Fluminense)
 (at Banfield)
(at All Boys)

(at Atlético Tucumán)
(at Tigre)

Competitions

Summer recess mid-season friendlies

Primera B Nacional

Results summary

Results by round

Fixtures and results

League table

Copa Argentina

Squad statistics

Appearances and goals

|-
|colspan="14"|Players who appeared for River Plate no longer at the club:

|}

Top scorers

Disciplinary record

Team kit
These are the 2011–12 River Plate kits.

References

Club Atlético River Plate seasons
River Plate